"Where Do You Go" is a song written by Peter Bischof and Frank Farian. It was first recorded in 1995 by German Eurodance band La Bouche as an album-only track from their debut album, Sweet Dreams (1995). A cover version of the song was then recorded by American-German Europop trio No Mercy, taken from their debut album, My Promise (1996). On 13 May 1996, it was released as their first single and became a worldwide hit entering the top five in Australia, Austria, Belgium, France, Germany, Hungary, Lithuania, Switzerland, the United Kingdom, and the United States.

American entertainment company BuzzFeed ranked the song number eight in their list of "The 101 Greatest Dance Songs of the '90s" in 2017. In 2021, it was ranked number forty in their list of "The 50 Best '90s Songs of Summer".

Background and release
The group's frontman Marty Cintron was discovered by German music producer Frank Farian when he played at a club in Ocean Drive, Miami. He suggested that they should do a project together. Cintron then went to Farian's studio in Germany. Farian thought the best way to go was with a group, so Cintron introduced him to twin brothers and dancers Ariel and Gabriel Hernández which he had worked with earlier. They had toured with Prince and been in some of his videos. The first song the group recorded was "Missing", which Farian had gotten permission to record after hearing the song in Ibiza. Their version made it to the top 5 in Switzerland and became a big hit throughout Europe. But it was their next single, "Where Do You Go", which was released in May 1996, that became an international success. It peaked at number-one in Denmark, Ireland and Scotland.

Content
"Where Do You Go" is a dance track with a 4/4 rhythm structure, running at a speed of 127 beats per minute. It is built around a drum beat that was sampled from the Todd Terry remix of the song "Missing", by English act Everything But The Girl. The chorus hook "where do you go, my lovely?" references Peter Sarstedt's 1969 hit "Where Do You Go To (My Lovely)".

Critical reception
AllMusic editor Leo Stanley highlighted the song in his review of No Mercy, stating that "they have enough hooks and beats to crossover to the charts and dancefloors." Larry Flick from Billboard wrote, "Look for this Latin male trio to continue Arista's winning streak of slam-dunking Euro-splashed dance ditties on pop radio." He added, "This time, the beats are spiked with fluttering acoustic guitar riffs and making for a jam that will have punters revisiting their fave old hustle dance steps. Icing on the cake is an immediately contagious chorus and an irresistible a cappella breakdown midway through the song. Fun, fun, fun." Matt Stopera and Brian Galindo from BuzzFeed noted, "Spanish guitar + aggressive '90s dance-music beat = perfection." A reviewer from Chicago Sun-Times deemed it "bewitching". Bob Cannon from Entertainment Weekly said that "like any good dance track, its hook buries itself deep in your brain." He also complimented its "snazzy flamenco guitar licks and production touches". Dave Sholin from the Gavin Report commented, "This trio of experienced dancers/performers will find a warm reception from Top 40 programmers searching for fresh sounds to fill those pop/dance slots. The threesome hail from Miami and are currently breaking in Europe with this polished, uptempo production." Howard Cohen for The Miami Herald wrote, "The club song's sole distinction, aside from its fluttery flamenco guitar licks, is an insistently annoying chorus hook you can't shake." Also Diana Valois from The Morning Call stated that its guitar riff "still sounds irresistible". Alan Jones from Music Week said it "shuffles along in much the same style as Missing, with tasteful acoustic guitars and a nicely understated dance beat. Tuneful, well sung and very likely a hit."

Chart performance
"Where Do You Go" was very successful on the charts all over the world, peaking at number-one on both the Canadian RPM Dance/Urban chart and the US Billboard Hot Dance Singles Sales chart. In Europe, it reached the top spot in Denmark, Ireland and Scotland. The single made it to the Top 10 also in Austria, Belgium (Wallonia), France, Germany, Hungary (number two), Italy, Lithuania, the Netherlands, Sweden, Switzerland and the UK, as well as on the Eurochart Hot 100, where it reached number four. In the UK, "Where Do You Go" peaked at number two in its fourth week at the UK Singles Chart, on 2 February 1997. It was held off reaching the top spot by LL Cool J's "Ain't Nobody" and spent two weeks at that position. Additionally, it was a Top 20 hit in Finland and a Top 30 hit in Iceland. Outside Europe, it reached number two in Australia, number five on both the Billboard Hot 100 and the Cash Box Top 100 in the US, and number 27 in New Zealand. The single earned a gold record in New Zealand and the US and a platinum record in Australia, Germany, and the UK.

Music video
The accompanying music video for "Where Do You Go" was directed by Austrian film director and film producer Hannes Rossacher and premiered in September 1996. It was filmed in Miami, Florida.

Impact and legacy
In 2017, BuzzFeed ranked "Where Do You Go" number eight in their "The 101 Greatest Dance Songs Of the '90s" list. In 2019, Billboard placed it at number 189 in their ranking of "Billboards "Top Songs of the '90s". In 2021, BuzzFeed ranked the song number 40 in their "The 50 Best '90s Songs of Summer" list.

Track listings

 7-inch single
 "Where Do You Go" (Radio Mix) – 4:15
 "Where Do You Go" (Trip House Mix Edit) – 4:26

 12-inch maxi
 "Where Do You Go" (Trip House Mix) – 7:10
 "Where Do You Go" (Manumission Mix) – 5:34
 "Where Do You Go" (Spike Mix) – 6:22
 "Where Do You Go" (Spike Dub Mix) – 6:07

 CD single
 "Where Do You Go" (Radio Mix) – 4:18
 "Where Do You Go" (Ocean Drive Mix) – 7:27

 CD maxi, Europe
 "Where Do You Go" (Radio Mix) – 4:28
 "Where Do You Go" (Ocean Drive Mix) – 7:27
 "Where Do You Go" (Club Mix) – 7:10
 "Where Do You Go" (Spike Mix) – 6:25
 "Where Do You Go" (Spike Dub Mix) – 6:05
 "Where Do You Go" (Manumission Mix) – 5:33

Charts

Weekly charts

Year-end charts

Decade-end charts

Certifications and sales

Release history

References

1995 songs
1996 singles
1997 singles
Arista Records singles
Bertelsmann Music Group singles
Canadian Singles Chart number-one singles
English-language German songs
Irish Singles Chart number-one singles
La Bouche songs
No Mercy (pop band) songs
Number-one singles in Denmark
Number-one singles in Scotland
Song recordings produced by Frank Farian
Songs written by Frank Farian
Songs written by Peter Bischof-Fallenstein